The 1930 United States Senate election in South Dakota took place on November 4, 1930. Incumbent Republican Senator William H. McMaster ran for re-election to a second term. After beating back a challenge in the Republican primary from former State Senator George J. Danforth, McMaster faced Democratic nominee William J. Bulow, the incumbent Governor, in the general election. As the Democratic Party performed well nationwide, Bulow narrowly defeated McMaster.

Democratic Primary

Candidates
 William J. Bulow, Governor of South Dakota
 James McNamara, former State Senator from Beadle County

Results

Republican Primary

Candidates
 William H. McMaster, incumbent U.S. Senator
 George J. Danforth, former State Senator from Minnehaha County

Results

General election

Results

References

South Dakota
1930
1930 South Dakota elections